The men's vault competition at the 2016 Summer Olympics in Rio de Janeiro was held at the HSBC Arena on 15 August 2016. There were 17 competitors from 14 nations. The event was won by Ri Se-gwang of North Korea, the nation's first medal in the men's vault. Denis Ablyazin repeated as silver medalist, the eighth man to win multiple medals in the event. Kenzō Shirai earned Japan's first medal in the men's vault since 1984 with his bronze.

The medals were presented by Chang Ung, IOC Member, People's Republic of Korea, and Ali Al-Hitmi, FIG Executive Committee Member.

Background

This was the 24th appearance of the event, which is one of the five apparatus events held every time there were apparatus events at the Summer Olympics (no apparatus events were held in 1900, 1908, 1912, or 1920). Three of the eight finalists from 2012 returned—silver medalist Denis Ablyazin of Russia, bronze medalist Igor Radivilov of Ukraine, and fourth-place finisher Tomás González of Chile. Two other 2012 finalists, fifth-place finisher Samuel Mikulak of the United States and eighth-place finisher Kristian Thomas of Great Britain, competed in gymnastics in Rio de Janeiro but did not perform the necessary two vaults in the qualifying round to compete in the vault. Marian Drăgulescu of Romania, the 2004 bronze medalist and 2008 fourth-place finisher, also returned. The favorite was Ri Se-gwang of North Korea, who had won the last two world championships (2014 and 2015).

Lithuania made its debut in the men's vault. The United States made its 21st appearance, most of any nation.

Qualification

Qualification for the men's artistic gymnastics in 2008 was based primarily on the 2015 World Artistic Gymnastics Championships. The top 8 teams at the world championships could send a full team of 5 gymnasts to the Olympics. The next 8 teams (#9 through #16) competed in the 2012 Gymnastics Olympic Test Event, with the top 4 of those teams also qualifying a team of 5 gymnasts for the Olympics. The individual apparatus medalists from the World Championships also qualified, if their nation had not already qualified a team. There were places reserved for host country and continental representation, and the Tripartite Commission made an invitation. The quota of 98 gymnasts was then filled through the individual all-around rankings at the Test Event, with each nation able to qualify only one gymnast in that manner (though this one gymnast could be added to the world championship apparatus medalists—for example, Romania qualified Marian Drăgulescu as silver medalist in vault and Andrei Muntean through Test Event).

Competition format

The top 8 qualifiers in the qualification phase (limit two per NOC) advanced to the apparatus final. On vault, only gymnasts who performed two skills on vault were considered for the final. The average score of the two skills was counted. The finalists again performed two vaults. Qualification scores were then ignored with only final round scores (average of the two skills) counting.

Schedule 

All times are Brasília Time (UTC-03:00)

Results

Qualifying

The gymnasts who ranked top eight qualified for final round. In case of there were more than two gymnasts in same NOC, the last ranked among them would not qualify to final round. The next best ranked gymnast would qualify instead. Although four gymnasts (Shirai, Radivilov, Drăgulescu and Nagornyy) posted third highest average score (15.283), tiebreak procedures were activated and successfully separated each athlete by rank. Shirai ranked ahead in third while Nagornyy ranked sixth overall due to highest (15.466) and lowest (15.300) single vault score. Because Drăgulescu and Radivilov had identical scores on both vaults, their ranks were then separated by identifying the single top E-score among their already-completed vaults, resulting in Radivilov ranking ahead in fourth and Drăgulescu in fifth overall (9.433 vs 9.333).

Final

The tiebreak procedure was used due to final scores tying for third highest. Kenzō Shirai of Japan won the bronze medal with Marian Drăgulescu of Romania placing fourth due to Shirai's top E-score being higher than Drăgulescu's (15.833 versus 15.633), and with identical scores in total, and separate vaults as well as both E- and D-scores, Nikita Nagornyy of Russia and Oleg Verniaiev of Ukraine ended the competition in a rare tie for fifth place since the tiebreak procedure would be ineffective in such instances. Ties at the Olympics are far less common since 2000 (thanks to new tie-breaking rules), but remain possible if the total, E- and then D-scores of both vaults all finished with identical values. Shirai and Ihor Radivilov of Ukraine also successfully originated two new skills in the final—the Shirai 2, 3½-twisting Yurchenko, and Radivilov, handspring triple front somersault, even though the latter did have a crash landing. Despite that, the reason justifying the naming credit was because Radivilov was able to perform skill, landing feet first, which the rules had to count it as a valid vault, and thus the skill including its high D-score had to also be accepted into the Code of Points. The Shirai 2 is now 1 of 5 vaults with the top D-score of 6.0 in the 2017–2020 Code of Points, but even with the highest assigned D-score of 7.0, the Radivilov has since been banned after Rio by the FIG in competitions due to the determined high risk of injury factor when attempting and training the skill.

References

Men's vault
2016
Men's 2016
Men's events at the 2016 Summer Olympics